Thirumurugan is an Indian Tamil film and television director. He holds a Guinness World Record for the longest continuous camera shot.

Career
After graduating from Chennai film institute, Thirumurugan, began his career on television in Doordarshan with the teleserial Gokulam Colony and also directed Chinnathirai Kathaigal for JJ TV.  He then directed and acted in Metti Oli.  His entry into the Kollywood film industry was with Em Magan (2006), which was also much talked about. After the success of Em Magan, he partnered with actor Bharath, in a film titled Muniyandi Vilangial Moonramandu.

He also directed the drama, Nadhaswaram where he also played the role of the lead actor. During a live episode, he directed a continuous camera shot lasting 23 minutes and 25 seconds, which is listed as a Guinness World Record.

Filmography

Films

Short films

Television

Serials
As actor

As Director

Other Works

Awards and honours

References

External links 

Living people
Television personalities from Tamil Nadu
Tamil film directors
Film directors from Tamil Nadu
21st-century Tamil male actors
Tamil Nadu State Film Awards winners
21st-century Indian film directors
Tamil male television actors
Year of birth missing (living people)
Tamil television directors
Tamil television producers
Tamil television writers